The following is a list of Teen Choice Award winners and nominees for Choice Summer TV Series. This award was first introduced in 2005 with Degrassi: The Next Generation being the inaugural recipient. 

Teen Wolf is the series with most wins in this category, with four wins of six nominations. While, So You Think You Can Dance is the most nominated series with fourteen nominations, winning twice. Currently the last series awarded as Choice Summer TV Series is Stranger Things in 2019.

Winners and nominees

2000s
{|class="wikitable" width=70%
!Year
!Winners
!Nominees
!Ref.
|-
|align="center"|2005
|Degrassi: The Next Generation
|
American Dad!
Beauty and the Geek
Big Brother
Dancing with the Stars
Hell's Kitchen
Laguna Beach: The Real Orange County
The Real World: Austin
|align="center"|
|-
|align="center"|2006
|So You Think You Can Dance
|
America's Got Talent
Big Brother: All-Stars
Entourage
Kyle XY
Rock Star: Supernova
|align="center"|
|-
|align="center"|2007
|Degrassi: The Next Generation
|
America's Got Talent
Don't Forget the Lyrics!
The Singing Bee
So You Think You Can Dance
|align="center"|
|-
|align="center"|2008
|The Secret Life of the American Teenager
|
America's Best Dance Crew
Degrassi: The Next Generation
High School Musical: Get in the Picture
So You Think You Can Dance
|align="center"|
|-
|align="center"|2009
|Princess Protection Program
|
Make It or Break It
Paris Hilton's My New BFF
The Secret Life of the American Teenager
So You Think You Can Dance
|align="center"|

 The Secret life of the American Teenager 

 Gossip Girl 

 The Next step 

  Pretty little liars 

  Manifest 

 Once Upon A time 

  The Flash 

 Arrow 

 SuperGirl 

 Legacies 

 Glee 

  
 One tree hill 

 Friends 

 Emily in Paris

2010s

Series with multiple wins 

4 Wins

 Teen Wolf

3 Wins

 Pretty Little Liars

2 Wins

 So You Think You Can Dance
 Degrassi: The Next Generation

Series with multiple nominations 
14 Nominations

 So You Think You Can Dance

6 Nominations

 Teen Wolf

4 Nominations

 America's Got Talent
 The Secret Life Of The American Teenager

3 Nominations

 Baby Daddy
 Degrassi: The Next Generation
 Pretty Little Liars
 The Bold Type
 The Fosters

2 Nominations

 Big Brother
Beat Shazam
 Cobra Kai
 Girl Meets World
 Make It Or Break It
 Under The Dome
 Wipeout
 Young & Hungry

References

Summer TV Series
TV Series